Agorius is a genus of spiders in the family Salticidae (jumping spiders). The genera Agorius and Synagelides (and perhaps Pseudosynagelides) are separated as a genus group, sometimes called subfamily Agoriinae but more recently downranked to tribe Agoriini of the Salticoida clade in subfamily Salticinae.

History
Agorius was first described by Tamerlan Thorell in 1877. No new species were described for about one hundred years, with seven new species found in the twenty-first century. Undescribed species have been found in Malaysia and Sabah. Several more species have been found but not yet described.

Description
Both sexes are about six to eight mm long. Agorius is similar to Myrmarachne, another good ant mimic, but can be distinguished from it by having no large, forward-pointing chelicerae, and is not found on vegetation above the ground, but only in rain forest leaf litter.

A. borneensis, A. formicinus, A. saaristoi and A. semirufus are only known from male specimens; A. cinctus, A. gracilipes and A. marieae are only known from a female.

Species

As of April 2017, the World Spider Catalog accepts 12 species in the genus:
 Agorius baloghi Szüts, 2003 – New Guinea, New Britain
 Agorius borneensis Edmunds & Prószyński, 2001 – Borneo
 Agorius cinctus Simon, 1901 – Java, Lombok
 Agorius constrictus Simon, 1901 – Malaysia, Singapore
 Agorius formicinus Simon, 1903 – Sumatra
 Agorius gracilipes Thorell, 1877 – Sulawesi
 Agorius kerinci Prószyński, 2009 – Sumatra
 Agorius lindu Prószyński, 2009 – Sulawesi
 Agorius marieae Freudenschuss & Seiter, 2016 –  Philippines 
 Agorius saaristoi Prószyński, 2009 – Borneo
 Agorius semirufus Simon, 1901 – Philippines
 Agorius tortilis Cao & Li, 2016 – China

References

Further reading
 Edmunds, M. & Prószynski, J. (2001): New species of Malaysian Agorius and Sobasina (Araneae: Salticidae). Bull. Br. arachnol. Soc. 12: 139-143.

External links
 Salticidae.org: Diagnostic drawings and photographs

Salticidae
Salticidae genera
Spiders of Asia